Euscaphurus is a genus of plate-thigh beetles in the family Eucinetidae. There are at least three described species in Euscaphurus.

Species
These three species belong to the genus Euscaphurus:
 Euscaphurus nikkon Vít, 1977
 Euscaphurus saltator Casey, 1885
 Euscaphurus spinipes Vit, 1995

References

Further reading

 
 

Scirtoidea
Articles created by Qbugbot